The 928th Expeditionary Air Refueling Squadron is a provisional unit of the United States Air Force.  It is assigned to Air Mobility Command to activate or inactivate as needed for contingency operations.

The squadron was first active during World War II as the 28th Photographic Reconnaissance Squadron. After training in the United States the unit moved to the Pacific.  Although squadron headquarters remained in Hawaii until the invasion of Okinawa, it deployed detachments to support combat operations in the Pacific.  Its last wartime assignment was with the 316th Bombardment Wing at Yontan Airfield, Okinawa where it was inactivated on 29 May 1946.

The 928th Air Refueling Squadron was active from 1959 to 1960 at Ellsworth Air Force Base, South Dakota as the 28th Bombardment Wing converted to Boeing B-52 Stratofortress bombers.  The squadrons were consolidated on 19 September 1985 and converted to provisional status as the 928th Expeditionary Air Refueling Squadron in 2003.

History

World War II

The squadron was first activated at Peterson Field, Colorado in the spring of 1943 as one of the original four squadrons of the 7th Photographic Group.  It was transferred to the Third Air Force Photographic Unit Training Center a month later in preparation for the 7th group's transfer on paper to the European Theater of Operations. Although the 28th was assigned other aircraft at times, its primary equipment was the Lockheed F-5 Lightning.

The squadron was attached to the 2d Photographic Reconnaissance and Mapping Group and moved with the group to Will Rogers Field in October 1943.  The 2d group acted as an Operational Training Unit and as a Replacement Training Unit while the squadron was attached to it. It was an oversized unit that provided cadres to "satellite groups" and at the same time trained individual pilots and aircrews. The squadron continued to train with the F-5 until shipping overseas.

In January 1944 the unit arrived in the Central Pacific Area.  Although squadron headquarters remained in Hawaii until Operation Iceberg, the invasion of Okinawa in May 1945, it deployed elements that saw combat in the Central and Western Pacific from late June 1944.  After arriving in Okinawa the 28th continued in combat until the Japanese surrender in August 1945.  It remained on Okinawa as part of the occupation forces until it was inactivated in 1946.

Post war operations
The 928th Air Refueling Squadron was activated at Ellsworth Air Force Base, South Dakota in 1959 as the refueling element of the 28th Bombardment Wing in 1959 as the wing converted from Convair B-36 Peacemakers to Boeing B-52 Stratofortresses. The conversion of the 28th wing to "Buffs" and move of two of its bombardment squadrons to other bases was part of SAC's program to disperse its Boeing B-52 Stratofortress bombers over a larger number of bases, thus making it more difficult for the Soviet Union to knock out the entire fleet with a surprise first strike. SAC bases with large concentrations of bombers made attractive targets.  SAC's response was to break up its wings and scatter their aircraft over a larger number of bases.

In July 1960 the squadron deployed eight of its tankers to Grand Forks Air Force Base, South Dakota to test the ability of the 4133d Strategic Wing at Grand Forks to maintain an air refueling alert force. Two months after the return of these planes to Ellsworth, the squadron was inactivated and its mission, personnel, and equipment were transferred to the 28th Air Refueling Squadron.

In 1985 the 28th Photographic Reconnaissance Squadron and the 928th Air Refueling Squadron were consolidated into a single unit.  In 2003 the consolidated squadron was converted to provisional status as the 928th Expeditionary Air Refueling Squadron.

Lineage
 28th Photographic Reconnaissance Squadron
 Constituted as: 28th Photographic Reconnaissance Squadron on 5 February 1943
 Redesignated as: 28th Photographic Squadron (Light) on 6 February 1943
 Activated on 1 May 1943
 Redesignated as: 28th Photographic Reconnaissance Squadron on 11 August 1943
 Inactivated on 29 May 1946<ref name=Maurer28PRS2>Lineage information, including assignments, stations, and aircraft to 1946 in Maurer, ''Combat Squadrons, pp. 143–144, except as noted</ref>
 Consolidated on 19 September 1985 with the 928th Air Refueling Squadron as the 928th Air Refueling Squadron 928th Air Refueling Squadron
 Constituted as the 928th Air Refueling Squadron, Heavy on 5 January 1959
 Activated on 8 February 1959
 Inactivated on 1 October 1960
 Consolidated on 19 September 1985 with the 28th Photographic Reconnaissance Squadron
 Redesignated 928th Expeditionary Air Refueling Squadron and converted to provisional status on 20 March 2003

Assignments
 7th Photographic Group (later 7th Photographic Reconnaissance and Mapping Group) 1 May 1943
 Third Air Force Photographic Unit Training Center, (attached to 2d Photographic Reconnaissance and Mapping Group) 21 June 1943
 III Reconnaissance Command, 15 August 1943
 89th Reconnaissance Training Wing, 27 September 1943 (attached to 9th Photographic Reconnaissance Group after 16 November 1943)
 Seventh Air Force, c. 16 January 1944 (attached to VII Fighter Command 24 January 1944
 VI Air Service Area Command (remained attached to VII Fighter Command, 12 December 1944
 Seventh Air Force, 23 April 1945
 Eighth Air Force, 31 August 1945
 316th Bombardment Wing, 15 May 1946 – 29 May 1946
 28th Bombardment Wing, 8 February 1959 – 1 October 1960

Stations
 Peterson Field, Colorado, 1 May 1943
 Will Rogers Field, Oklahoma, 13 October 1943 – 1 January 1944
 Kipapa Airfield, Hawaii, 16 January 1944
 Kualoa Airfield, Hawaii, 9 October 1944 (detachments of the squadron operated from:
 Kwajalein Airfield, Kwajalein, Marshall Islands, 30 June 1944 – 24 September 1944,
 East Field (Saipan), Mariana Islands, 11 July 1944 – May 1945.
 Peleliu Airfield, Peleliu, Palau Islands, 5 October 1944 – April 1945, and
 Ie Shima Airfield, Okinawa, 23 April 1945 – 21 June 1945)
 Yontan Airfield, Okinawa, 8 May 1945 – 29 May 1946
 Ellsworth Air Force Base, South Dakota, 8 February 1959 – 1 October 1960

Aircraft
 Lockheed F-5 Lightning, 1943–1946
 Lockheed P-38 Lightning, 1943
 North American F-4 Mustang, 1943
 Douglas A-24 Skyraider, 1944
 Boeing KC-135A Stratotanker, 1959–1960

Campaigns

See also
 List of P-38 Lightning operators
 List of United States Air Force air refueling squadrons

References

Notes
 Explanatory notes

 Citations

Bibliography

Further reading
 

Air refueling squadrons of the United States Air Force
Air expeditionary squadrons of the United States Air Force